The 36th South American Junior Championships in Athletics were held at the Estadio Municipal Jorge Newbery in Rosario, Argentina from October 1–2, 2005.

Participation (unofficial)
Detailed result lists can be found on the Atletismo Rosario and on the "World Junior Athletics History" website.  An unofficial count yields the number of about 294 athletes from about 13 countries:  Argentina (60), Bolivia (1), Brazil (70), Chile (38), Colombia (21), Ecuador (16), Guyana (2), Panama (4), Paraguay (25), Peru (14), Suriname (2), Uruguay (17), Venezuela (24).

Medal summary
Medal winners are published for men and women, and on the IAAF website.
Complete results can be found on the Atletismo Rosario and on the "World Junior Athletics History" website.

Men

Women

Medal table (unofficial)

Final scoring per countries

Final scoring per countries were published.

Overall

Men

Women

References

External links
World Junior Athletics History

South American U20 Championships in Athletics
Athletics
South American U20 Championships
International athletics competitions hosted by Argentina
2005 in South American sport
2005 in youth sport